Laguna Summit is a highway pass through the Cuyamaca Mountains of southeastern San Diego County, California, traversed by Interstate 8 at an altitude of . 

Of the four  highway summits eastward of San Diego, the Laguna Summit is the second. The first highway summit has been unnamed until "Carpenter Summit" was proposed in late 2019, now pending the United States Geological Survey approval. The third is Crestwood Summit followed by the Tecate Divide. 

Laguna Summit is located east of Pine Valley, just to the east of the intersection with the Sunrise Highway, which heads north towards the Laguna Mountains. The pass is also traversed by Old Highway 80 at the junction of County Route S1, also known as the "Sunrise Highway" then continuing as a frontage road of Interstate 8 on the south side of the freeway.

Construction
The Interstate 8 route was realigned from Arnold Way onto Alpine Boulevard as it passed through Alpine and the Viejas Indian Reservation, before entering the Laguna Mountains and the Cleveland National Forest mostly paralleling the alignment used by old US 80.

By August 1970, the remainder of the freeway had been funded, with the part from Japatul Valley Road to Laguna Junction costing $22 million (about $ in  dollars),  (about $ in  dollars).

A portion of old US 80 that followed the grade eastward from Pine Valley up to the Sunrise Highway junction had to be closed for construction.  A cut off road (now named old US 80) direct from Pine Valley eastward to the Sunrise Highway, also known as County Route S1 (a route to Mt. Laguna) was made prior to freeway construction. Near the "Laguna Junction", was a road house cafe of the same name for travelers that existed from 1916 until it was removed in 1971 to provide land for the I-8 interchange. The United States Geological Survey now cites "Laguna Junction" as a historical place name replaced by "Laguna Summit." 

A section of old US 80 — with the first few miles signed as SR 79 — continues to serve as access to the communities of Descanso, Guatay and Pine Valley; SR 79 intersected US 80 east of Descanso.

I-8 crests a 4,000 foot highway summit, at the old Laguna Junction, now called Laguna Summit before descending towards Buckman Springs Road. 

Google Street view.

References

See also 
Interstate 8 at California Highways
Interstate 8 at the Interstate Guide
Interstate 8 in California and Arizona at AA Roads

Mountain passes of California
Interstate 8
Mountain ranges of San Diego County, California